The Wind Sculpted Land is a 2018 Estonian documentary film directed by Joosep Matjus and narrated by actor Hannes Kaljujärv. The film is dedicated to the beauty of Estonian nature.

The film has won several awards, e.g. in 2018 Matsalu Nature Film Festival in the category Nature: Best Cinematography.

References

External links
 
 The Wind Sculpted Land, entry in Estonian Film Database (EFIS)

2018 films
Estonian documentary films
Estonian-language films
2018 documentary films